Jens Martin Gammelby (born 5 February 1995) is a Danish professional footballer who plays as a right-back for Eliteserien club HamKam.

Club career

Silkeborg IF
Gammelby is a youth product from Silkeborg IF. He joined the club as U14 player.

Gammelby made his Danish Superliga debut on 27 March 2014 in a 1–0 win over Hobro IK, where he was in the starting line-up.

In April 2014, Gammelby signed a contract extension, keeping him in Silkeborg until 2017. Gammelby was playing on fulltime in Silkeborg IF from the summer 2015.

Brøndby IF
In May 2018, it was reported that Gammelby would leave Silkeborg IF to join Brøndby IF in summer 2018, having agreed to a five-year contract after a breakout season for Silkeborg. He was handed shirt number 2. On 29 July 2018, Gammelby made his debut as a substitute against Hobro IK, which ended in 2–1 win. During his first season in Brøndby, he struggled to make the starting lineup with head coach Alexander Zorniger preferring first Johan Larsson and since Kevin Mensah at the right back position. Gammelby made 17 appearances and scored one goal during his first season at the club.

During the 2019–20 season under new head coach Niels Frederiksen, Gammelby continued to struggle to make the starting lineup, with Frederiksen preferring Mensah and Larsson at his position. As Brøndby transitioned into a 3–5–2 formation during the fall, and left back Anthony Jung began playing in central defense with Mensah transitioning to the left back position as well as Larsson's contract expiring, Gammelby was expected to play more regularly during the latter half of the season.

Loan to Lyngby
On 5 October 2020, transfer deadline day, Gammelby moved to Superliga rivals Lyngby Boldklub on a season-long loan with an option to buy. He made his debut two days later, on 7 October, in a 5–4 win over Brønshøj in the Danish Cup. He suffered relegation to the Danish 1st Division with the club on 9 May 2021 after a loss to last placed AC Horsens before returning to Brøndby after his loan deal expired. This happened despite experiencing a strong season individually, scoring 4 goals in 27 total appearances as he was the preferred option as right winger for the team.

Return to Brøndby
Despite doubts about his future Brøndby career, Gammelby received plenty of playing time in different positions in the 2021–22 pre-season. He started on the bench in the Superliga premiere against AGF, but was subbed on in the second half. On 17 August, he made his debut in the UEFA Champions League in a 2–1 away loss to Red Bull Salzburg in the first leg of the play-off round.

Loan to Miedź Legnica
On 21 January 2022, Gammelby was loaned out to Polish club Miedź Legnica for the rest of the year. He was recalled from his loan on 29 August 2022, to cover for injured players in the Brøndby team.

Second return to Brøndby
Gammelby made his competitive return for Brøndby on 4 September 2022, as he was preferred as right-back by head coach Niels Frederiksen ahead of Sebastian Sebulonsen in a 2–0 league win against AC Horsens. He scored his first goal after returning on 30 October, opening the score in the second minute against AaB.

HamKam
On 14 February 2023, Gammelby was sold to Norwegian Eliteserien club HamKam.

International career
He was handed his first cap for Denmark League XI in Denmark's 3–2 loss to Jordan in a friendly on 15 January 2018, scoring one goal in the match.

Career statistics

Club

International

Scores and results list Denmark's goal tally first.

Honours
Miedź Legnica
I liga: 2021–22

References

External links

Living people
1995 births
Danish men's footballers
Danish expatriate men's footballers
People from Ikast-Brande Municipality
Association football fullbacks
Denmark youth international footballers
Denmark under-21 international footballers
Sportspeople from the Central Denmark Region
Danish Superliga players
Danish 1st Division players
I liga players
Ekstraklasa players
Silkeborg IF players
Brøndby IF players
Lyngby Boldklub players
Miedź Legnica players
Hamarkameratene players
Expatriate footballers in Poland
Expatriate footballers in Norway
Danish expatriate sportspeople in Poland
Danish expatriate sportspeople in Norway